The Glass House is a 1972 American made-for-television drama film starring Alan Alda, Vic Morrow, and Clu Gulager, directed by Tom Gries. It originally aired on CBS on February 4, 1972.

Synopsis
A college professor convicted of manslaughter and a prison guard both start their first day in the same prison.

Cast
 Alan Alda as Jonathon Paige
 Vic Morrow as Hugo Slocum
 Clu Gulager as Brian Courtland
 Billy Dee Williams as Lennox
 Kristoffer Tabori as Allan Campbell
 Dean Jagger as Warden Auerbach
 Scott Hylands as Ajax
 Edward Bell as Sinclair
 Roy Jenson as Officer Brown
 Alan Vint as Bree
 Luke Askew as Bibleback
 Tony Mancini as Steve Berino
 G. Wood as Pagonis (uncredited)

Production
Filming took place at Utah State Prison in Draper, Utah, 20 miles outside of Salt Lake City.

Accolades
Tom Gries won a Primetime Emmy Award for Outstanding Directing for a Limited Series, Movie, or Dramatic Special in 1972 for directing this TV movie. The film also won the Golden Shell at the 1972 San Sebastián International Film Festival.

References

External links

1972 television films
1972 films
1972 drama films
American drama television films
CBS network films
Films based on works by Truman Capote
Films directed by Tom Gries
Films scored by Billy Goldenberg
Films shot in Utah
1970s American films
1970s English-language films